Avard Moncur (born November 2, 1978) is a Bahamian track and field athlete competing in the 400 metres. He was born in Nassau.

Career
Under the guidance of coach Henry Rolle, Moncur's most successful year came in 2001 when he won the gold medal in the 400m and the 4 × 400 m relay at the 2001 World Championships. Moncur has only managed to make one more appearance in the individual final of a major championship, at the 2007 World Championships where he finished 8th.

More success, however, has come has part of the Bahamas relay team. At the 2005 World Championships he (together with Nathaniel McKinney, Andrae Williams and Chris Brown) won a silver medal in 4 x 400 metres relay.

At the 2007 World Championships, Moncur (together with Williams, Brown and Michael Mathieu) won silver in the 4 × 400 m relay for the third time in 2.59.18s.

Moncur's personal best time and national record in the 400m is 44.45 seconds, achieved in July 2001 in Madrid. However, Chris Brown tied Moncur's national record at the 2007 World Championships.

In addition to currently coaching at the collegiate level, Moncur is coaching one on one lessons to track & field athletes in Atlanta, GA.

Achievements

References

External links
 
 Picture of Avard Moncur

1978 births
Living people
Sportspeople from Nassau, Bahamas
Bahamian male sprinters
Olympic athletes of the Bahamas
Athletes (track and field) at the 2000 Summer Olympics
Athletes (track and field) at the 2008 Summer Olympics
Athletes (track and field) at the 2006 Commonwealth Games
Athletes (track and field) at the 1999 Pan American Games
Athletes (track and field) at the 2007 Pan American Games
Olympic silver medalists for the Bahamas
Olympic bronze medalists for the Bahamas
Commonwealth Games medallists in athletics
World Athletics Championships medalists
Medalists at the 2008 Summer Olympics
Medalists at the 2000 Summer Olympics
Commonwealth Games bronze medallists for the Bahamas
Pan American Games gold medalists for the Bahamas
Olympic silver medalists in athletics (track and field)
Olympic bronze medalists in athletics (track and field)
Pan American Games medalists in athletics (track and field)
Goodwill Games medalists in athletics
World Athletics Championships winners
Competitors at the 2001 Goodwill Games
Medalists at the 2007 Pan American Games
Central American and Caribbean Games medalists in athletics
Central American and Caribbean Games bronze medalists for the Bahamas
Competitors at the 1998 Central American and Caribbean Games
Auburn University alumni
Auburn Tigers men's track and field athletes
Medallists at the 2002 Commonwealth Games